The Country Club District is the name of a group of neighborhoods comprising a historic upscale residential district in Kansas City, developed by noted real estate developer J.C. Nichols. The district was developed in stages between 1906 and 1950, and today is home to approximately 60,000 and includes such well-known Kansas City neighborhoods as Sunset Hill and Brookside in Missouri, Mission Hills, Fairway, and the oldest parts of Prairie Village in Kansas, making it the largest planned community built by a single developer in the United States. Ward Parkway, a wide, manicured boulevard, traverses the district running south from the Country Club Plaza, the first suburban shopping district in the United States.

History

J.C. Nichols began developing the district in 1906 with a neighborhood he called Bismarck Place. As his development expanded to include Countryside, he began to develop a master plan, which he dubbed the Country Club District because of its proximity to what was then the site of Kansas City Country Club, now Loose Park. Eventually, Nichols acquired a tract of land crossing from Missouri into Kansas, which now includes the neighborhood of Sunset Hill (in Missouri) and the cities of Mission Hills, Westwood Hills & Mission Woods (in Kansas). Nichols also built the nearby Country Club Plaza, the first shopping district in the United States designed to accommodate patrons arriving by automobile. Today, the Country Club District is the largest contiguous planned community built by a single developer in the United States.

Restrictive covenants
Nichols used restrictive covenants, or "deed restrictions", in each property in the district to control the use of the land. Most of the covenants pertain to the uses to which the property owner could put his land, or setback and free space requirements.

A controversial aspect of the covenants in the district, however, was the use of racial restrictions that prohibited ownership and occupation by African Americans. The 1948 Supreme Court decision Shelley v. Kraemer rendered such restrictions unenforceable, and the Fair Housing Act of 1968 prohibited the future incorporation of such covenants.  Nevertheless, restrictions continue to appear in the deeds to Country Club District properties. The restrictions require that a notice to amend be filed five years in advance of the deed restrictions renewal date, usually every 20 to 25 years; and that all homeowners must agree to the change with a notarized vote. This practical difficulty is the reason racial restrictions continue to appear throughout the district. At the same time, this practical difficulty has protected the other covenants from change, and thus has helped to preserve the essential character of the neighborhood and to resist encroachment by commercial developers.

While he utilized the restrictive covenant model to bar non-whites from his neighborhoods, Nichols was not the first in Kansas City to engage in the practice. In fact, such practice had been in full force in Kansas City since the time Nichols was born in the 1880s. Moreover, although Nichols's covenants were discriminatory, Kansas City historian William S. Worley noted that Nichols  was among the first of his contemporaries to abandon the practice of barring sale to Jews.

Today the Country Club District is still predominantly white, and still is home to Kansas City's wealthiest residents.

School desegregation and white flight

On the Missouri side, many Country Club residents formerly sent their children to Southwest High School, a public school in the Kansas City School District. At its peak in the mid-1960s, Southwest enrolled more than 2,400 students, 20% of whose parents were Southwest alumni.  After the end of racial segregation in schools under Brown v. Board of Education, however, Kansas City, Missouri, experienced considerable "white flight." 
It wasn't until the 1970s Southwest High School experienced large scale desegregation.  The 1972-1973 school year, Southwest was 2% Black.  In the following years, the school saw increases of Black students until becoming predominantly Black in the late 1970s.  This was due to full scale busing which began in the 1975-1976 school year.  By the 1997-1998 school year, Southwest's final year in existence, enrollment had dropped to below 500. As recently as 2008, nearly all residents of the Missouri side of the Country Club District sent their children to private schools, including Pembroke Hill School, The Barstow School, Rockhurst High School, St. Teresa's Academy, and Notre Dame de Sion.  Today, many residents send their children to charter schools including Academie Lafayette, Crossroads Academy, and Citizens of the World; and district schools Hale Cook, Foreign Language Academy, and Border Star Montessori.

Homes and residents
The Country Club district includes many homes by or after plans of many noted architects, including Frank Lloyd Wright; McKim, Mead, and White; Louis Curtiss; and Mary Rockwell Hook. Several homes are listed on the National Register of Historic Places. Notable residents of the Country Club District have included:

 Mayor Harold Roe Bartle
 Mayor Richard L. Berkley
 H&R Block founders Richard Bloch and Henry Bloch
 Senator Kit Bond
 Major League Baseball Hall of Famer George Brett
 author Evan S. Connell
 Hallmark Cards chairman Donald J. Hall, Sr.
 Hallmark Cards founder Joyce Hall
 composer John Kander
 businessman R. Crosby Kemper Jr.
 pharmaceutical magnate Ewing Kauffman and his wife Muriel Kauffman
 United States Senator Claire McCaskill
 UCLA and KU chancellor Franklin David Murphy
 political boss Tom Pendergast
 Ambassador Charles H. Price II
 columnist Calvin Trillin
 professional golfer Tom Watson
 Mayor Charles Wheeler.

Trivia
For two weeks in October 1977, renowned artist couple Christo and Jeanne-Claude wrapped Loose Park's 4.5 km of footpaths in 12,500 square meters of shiny, saffron-yellow nylon; the project cost the artists $130,000.

In 1970, members of the Students for a Democratic Society (SDS) were charged with pipe bombing the home of J.C. Nichols, in addition to other places in Kansas City. Three SDS members were convicted. See United States District Court for the Western District of Missouri, Western Division (Kansas City), Criminal Case Files (1879-1972), Case 23498.

Further reading
 Evan S. Connell, Mrs. Bridge (North Point Press, 1959) and Mr. Bridge (North Point Press, 1969).
 Novels set in the Country Club District between the 1920s to the 1940s, with frequent references to the district and the Country Club Plaza.
 Evan McKenzie, Privatopia: Homeowner Associations and the Rise of Residential Private Government (Yale University Press, 1996).
 Robert Pearson and Brad Pearson, The J. C. Nichols Chronicle: The Authorized Story of the Man and His Company, 1880–1994 (Lawrence, Kansas: University Press of Kansas).
 Sherry Lamb Shirmer, A City Divided: The Racial Landscape of Kansas City, 1900-1960.
 William S. Worley, J. C. Nichols and the Shaping of Kansas City:  Innovation in Planned Residential Communities (Columbia, Missouri:  University of Missouri Press, 1990).

See also
 Mr. and Mrs. Bridge 
 Merchant Ivory film based on Evan S. Connell's novels, filmed largely on location
 Quality Hill
 Kansas City neighborhood which was the predecessor to the Country Club District
 List of neighborhoods in Kansas City, Missouri

External links
 University of Missouri-Kansas City: "Ward Parkway: a Grand American Avenue"
 Original Map of the Country Club District—produced by the J.C. Nichols Company early on in the development
 Planning for Permanence—the speeches of J.C. Nichols
 Homes Associations of the Country Club District Home Page
Umbrella organization to all homes associations in the Country Club District, covering 22,000 homes
 Community Builder: The Life & Legacy of J.C. Nichols
A documentary about J.C. Nichols produced by PBS in 2006
 O High School, My High School!
Essay by Gerald Shapiro appearing in the Colorado Review about Southwest High School, the Country Club District, and racial segregation in Kansas City, Missouri

Kansas City metropolitan area
Neighborhoods in Kansas City, Missouri
Populated places established in 1906
1906 establishments in Missouri